Cymus is a genus of true bugs in the family Cymidae. There are at least 40 described species in Cymus.

Species
These 41 species belong to the genus Cymus:

 Cymus africanus Hamid, A., 1975 c g
 Cymus angustatus Stal, 1874 i c g b
 Cymus aurescens Distant, W.L., 1883 c g
 Cymus bellus Van Duzee, 1909 i c g
 Cymus braziliensis Hamid, A., 1975 c g
 Cymus californicus Hamid, 1975 i c g
 Cymus capeneri Hamid, A., 1975 c g
 Cymus ceylonensis Hamid, A., 1975 c g
 Cymus chinensis Hamid, A., 1975 c g
 Cymus claviculus (Fallén, 1807) i c g
 Cymus coriacipennis (Stål, 1859) i c g
 Cymus dipus Germar, E.F., 1837 c g
 Cymus discors Horvath, 1908 i c g b
 Cymus drakei Slater, J.A., 1964 c g
 Cymus elegans Josifov, M. & I.M. Kerzhner, 1978 c g
 Cymus ferrugineus Linnavuori, R., 1978 c g
 Cymus foliaceus Motschulsky, V., 1859 c g
 Cymus glandicolor Hahn, 1831 c g
 Cymus gracilicornis Vidal, J.P., 1940 c g
 Cymus guatemalanus Distant, 1893 i c g
 Cymus koreanus Josifov, M. & I.M. Kerzhner, 1978 c g
 Cymus luridus Stal, 1874 i c g b
 Cymus marginatus Puton, A., 1895 c g
 Cymus melanocephalus Fieber, F.X., 1861 c g
 Cymus melanotylus (Ashlock, P.D., 1961) c g
 Cymus mexicanus Distant, W.L., 1882 c g
 Cymus minutus Lindberg, H., 1939 c g
 Cymus nigrofemoralis Hamid, 1975 i c g
 Cymus nocturnus Bergroth, E. & H. Schouteden, 1905 c g
 Cymus novaezelandiae Woodward, T.E., 1954 c g
 Cymus remanei Heiss & Pericart, 1999 g
 Cymus robustus Barber, 1924 i c g b
 Cymus rufescens Hamid, A., 1975 c g
 Cymus ruficornis Hamid, A., 1975 c g
 Cymus simplex Horvath, G., 1882 c g
 Cymus sp nocturnus g
 Cymus syrianensis Hamid, A., 1975 c g
 Cymus tabaci Matsumura, S., 1910 c g
 Cymus tripunctatus (Van Duzee, E.P., 1933) c g
 Cymus tumescens Zheng, 1981 c g
 Cymus waelbroecki Bergroth, E., 1905 c g

Data sources: i = ITIS, c = Catalogue of Life, g = GBIF, b = Bugguide.net

References

Further reading

External links

 

Lygaeoidea
Pentatomomorpha genera